Trần Thanh Sơn (born 30 December 1997) is a Vietnamese footballer who plays as a central midfielder for V.League 2 club Công An Nhân Dân

International goals

Vietnam U23

Honours

Club
Công An Nhân Dân
V.League 2: 2022

References 

1997 births
Living people
Vietnamese footballers
Association football midfielders
V.League 1 players
Hoang Anh Gia Lai FC players
Competitors at the 2019 Southeast Asian Games
Southeast Asian Games medalists in football
Southeast Asian Games gold medalists for Vietnam